Peteinosaurus (meaning "winged lizard") was a prehistoric genus of pterosaur.

Discovery
 
Three fossils have been found near Cene, Italy. The first fossil, the holotype MCSNB 2886, is fragmentary and disarticulated. The second, the articulated paratype MCSNB 3359, lacks any diagnostic features of Peteinosaurus and thus might be a different species. This paratype has a long tail (20 cm) made more stiff by long extensions of the vertebrae; this feature is common among pterosaurs of the Triassic. The third example is MCSNB 3496, another fragmentary skeleton. All specimens are those of subadults and of none has the skull been preserved.

Like most pterosaurs, Peteinosaurus had bones that were strong but very light. Peteinosaurus is trimorphodontic, with three types of conical teeth. An insectivorous lifestyle has been attributed to Peteinosaurus. The fifth toe of Peteinosaurus was long and clawless. Its joint allowed it to flex in a different plane than the other phalanges in order to control the cruropatagium, as seen preserved in the specimen of Sordes pilosus PIN 2585.3.

The genus has been described by the German paleontologist Rupert Wild in 1978. The type species is Peteinosaurus zambellii. The genus name is derived from Greek peteinos, "winged" and sauros, "lizard", the latter being used to indicate any saurian. The specific name, zambellii, honours Rocco Zambelli, the curator of the Bergamo natural history museum.

Phylogeny and classification
Peteinosaurus is one of the oldest-known pterosaurs, and at a mere sixty centimetres, had a tiny wingspan when compared to some later genera, such as Pteranodon whose wingspan exceeded twenty feet. Its wings were also proportionally smaller than those of later pterosaurs, as its wing length was only twice the length of the hindlimb. All other known pterosaurs have wingspans at least three times the length of their hindlimbs. It also had single cusped teeth that lacked the specialized heterodonty present in the other Italian Triassic pterosaur genus, Eudimorphodon.

All these factors converge to hint that Peteinosaurus belongs to a group that possibly represents the most basal known pterosaurs: the Dimorphodontidae, to which it was assigned in 1988 by Robert L. Carroll. The only other known member of that group is the later genus Dimorphodon, which lent its name to the family including both genera. Later cladistic analyses however, have not shown a close connection between the two forms. Nevertheless, the possible basal position of Peteinosaurus has been affirmed by Fabio Marco Dalla Vecchia who suggested that Preondactylus, according to David Unwin the most basal pterosaur, might be a subjective junior synonym of Peteinosaurus. A 2010 cladistic analysis by Brian Andres and colleagues placed Peteinosaurus in Lonchognatha which includes Eudimorphodon and Austriadactylus as more basal. The following phylogenetic analysis follows the topology of Upchurch et al. (2015).
 

Mark Witton, however, considers Peteinosaurus to be a true dimorphodontid. A study published in 2020 found support for a sister-taxon relationship between Peteinosaurus and Macronychoptera, which together form the clade Zambellisauria.

See also

 List of pterosaur genera
 Timeline of pterosaur research

References

Pterosaurs
Late Triassic pterosaurs of Europe
Fossil taxa described in 1978